Klitsa Mountain is a prominent mountain on Vancouver Island, British Columbia, Canada, located  west of Beaver Creek and  southeast of Golden Hinde. It can be viewed from Highway 4 along Sproat Lake. It is the second highest mountain in the Alberni Valley area, after Mount Arrowsmith. its name derives from a Nuu-Chah-Nulth word meaning "always white".

See also
 List of mountains in Canada

References

Vancouver Island Ranges
One-thousanders of British Columbia
Clayoquot Land District